John Samuel Edmonds (1799 in Dorset, England – 1865 in Kerikeri, New Zealand)  was a New Zealand missionary, trader, stone mason and founding father.

Early life
John was the son of Robert Edmonds and Priscilla Edmonds (née Edmonds) of Dorset, England. While his parents had the same surname, they had a common ancestor at least five to six generations back. He married his first wife, Mary Ann Stickland (1804 in Swanage, Dorset, England to 9 March 1862 in Parnell, Auckland, New Zealand), on 25 July 1822 in Swanage, Dorset, England. They had four of their children in England before boarding the ship, Elizabeth on route to Australia and New Zealand upon the glowing recommendation of Rev. John Tucker who also journeyed to New Zealand with the Edmonds family. Their fifth child was born in Hobart, Tasmania and the remainder of their children were born in the Northland Region of New Zealand.

Edmonds would work as a catechist for the Church Missionary Society. He was a stone mason by trade, and helped build the wharf at Kerikeri in the late 1830s. He owned land at Kerikeri, where he built a stone house for his family, now known as the Edmonds Ruins. After Mary Anne's death, Edmonds would marry widow, Ellen Davies (née Hunter) with whom he had two children together.

Children
John Samuel's children were:

With Mary Ann
Samuel John Edmonds, born 18 November 1823 in Yorkshire, England, died 1888 in Auckland, New Zealand. He married Louisa Makepeace in 1853 and had 11 children. He was involved in the publication of the first newspaper in New Zealand to be printed completely in Te Reo Maori, The Korimako. Samuel line currently are in possession of the family bible handed down to the eldest son as was tradition at the time.
Arthur Edmonds (also known as Aata Edmonds), born 21 September 1825 in Kent, England, died 1914 in Haruru Falls, Bay of Islands. He would first marry Erana Kaire in 1845, and then Ani Ngarepe. He had 8 children by his first wife and 6 by his second. He was disowned by his father for having married Maori women.
William Edmonds, born 7 February 1829 in Kent, England and died 1897 in Auckland, New Zealand. He married Emmeline Shearer in Auckland in 1856. 
Henry Edmonds, born 4 December 1831 in Southborough, Kent, England and died in 1906 in Kerikeri, New Zealand. He married Anne Catherine Wilson Kemp in 1866 and had 9 children.
Alfred Samuel Edmonds, born 7 December 1833 in Hobart, Tasmania, and died 1898 in Tairua, Coromandel. He married Erana Te Onerere, by whom he had three children.  He later married Sarah Anne Makepeace, a sister of his eldest brother Samuel's wife, Louisa, and had 3 more children. 
John Tucker Edmonds, born 1835 and died in 1918 at Haruru Falls. He was named after the Rev. John Tucker. He married Raiha Pekama in 1857 and together they had 13 children. He did have a first marriage and had children to this wife but no information is known about her or those children. Like his older brother, Arthur, John was disowned by his father but for a different reason. When John Samuel listed his children in the family bible he omitted John Tucker Edmonds and would refer to him as "Edmonds by name but not by blood". It is speculated that Mary Ann and the Rev. John Tucker had an affair  and as to not cause controversy within the Missionary community, John Samuel claimed John Tucker Edmonds as his own but only by name.
Rueben Edmonds, born 1836 in Kerikeri, New Zealand.
Joseph Edmonds born 1836 in Kerikeri, New Zealand and died in 1882. He married Felicia Tremain and then Annie Coyle. He had 3 children by Coyle.
Jane Elizabeth Edmonds, born 1837 in Kerikeri, New Zealand and died in Rhode Island. She married George Edward Budlong, an American whaler who had settled in the Bay of Islands in 1857. They had 6 children together. In 1870 she and two of her children travelled to New Bedford on board the Alice Cameron.
Sarah Gammon Edmonds, born 1839 in Kerikeri, New Zealand. She married Louis Goffe in 1857 and then Samuel Francis Prockter. She had 5 children by Louis Goffe.
Matilda Edmonds, born 1843, she married John Wright Hingston in 1864. They had 8 children.

With Ellen
John George Petingale Edmonds
Mary Anne Edmonds

Errors in genealogy
Amateur genealogists tend to mix up many aspects of John Samuel's family tree from changing his mother's maiden name from Edmonds to Edmunds (his parents have a mutual ancestor), to mixing up his first wife Marianne's surname with Strickland (she is a Stickland) and with her niece's date of birth making her much younger than her husband, to added children that did not exist including Lucy, Rebecca and Robert George (to his second wife Ellen). These three individuals may have existed but may have been Ellen's children from her first marriage.

Cookbook Edmonds
It has been established that the descendants of John Samuel Edmonds and the descendants of Thomas Edmonds (creator of the Edmonds Cook Book) are not related. While John Samuel's descendants have maintained there may be a familial connection, Thomas's descendants have threatened litigation stating that both families, while carrying the same name, are not related.

Notable descendants

 Clarence R. Budlong, American tennis player
 Brendon Edmonds, rugby union player
 David Edmonds, cricketer
 Huia Edmonds, rugby union player
 Te Atawhai Hudson-Wihongi, football player
 Akira Ioane, rugby union player, son of Sandra Wihongi and brother of Reiko Ioane
 Nanaia Mahuta, politician
 Adam Parore, cricket player
 Chris Tremain, politician and son of Kel Tremain
 Garrick Tremain, artist, brother of Kel Tremain and uncle of Chris Tremain
 Kel Tremain, rugby union player
 Karena Wihongi, rugby union player
 Verina Wihongi, Olympic Taekwondo practitioner
 David Wikaira-Paul, actor

References

 Bibliography 

 

'

1799 births
1865 deaths
New Zealand stonemasons
English Anglican missionaries
People from Dorset
English emigrants to New Zealand
Anglican missionaries in New Zealand